The 2018 Africa T20 Cup was the fourth and final edition of the Africa T20 Cup, a Twenty20 cricket tournament. It was held in South Africa in September 2018, as a curtain-raiser to the 2018–19 South African domestic season. Provincial side KwaZulu-Natal Inland were the defending champions.

Organised by Cricket South Africa, the tournament was played between twenty teams. Sixteen of these teams had participated in previous years – thirteen South African provincial teams, national representative sides of Kenya, Namibia and Zimbabwe – and they were joined by South African teams Limpopo and Mpumalanga along with Nigeria and Uganda. The invitation was initially extended to Ghana, but they declined.

Uganda's captain, Roger Mukasa, said it would give the team "a priceless chance to get international exposure" ahead of the 2018 ICC World Cricket League Division Three tournament.

On the opening day of the tournament, Marco Marais scored an unbeaten century for Border against Namibia in Group C. In Group D, Shane Dadswell scored 98 runs from 34 balls for North West, which Cricket South Africa described as "the performance of the day". On the second day, Marais scored his second century, making 106 not out. Wihan Lubbe also scored a century, batting for North West against Limpopo in Group D. In the same match, North West scored 262 runs, the second-highest score in T20 cricket.

Following the conclusion of the group stage of the tournament, Easterns, Gauteng, Border and North West had all progressed to the semi-finals of the competition. Gauteng and North West were drawn together in the first semi-final, with Border and Easterns playing each other in the second semi-final. The matches took place at Buffalo Park in East London.

In the first semi-final, Gauteng beat North West by 27 runs to progress to the final. They were joined by Border, after they beat Easterns by 7 wickets in the second semi-final. Gauteng won the tournament, beating Border by three wickets in the final.

For the next season, the tournament was replaced with the returning CSA Provincial T20 Cup, last played in the 2015–16 season, and featuring only the South African domestic provincial teams.

Pool A

Squads

Points table

Fixtures

Pool B

Squads

Points table

Fixtures

Pool C

Squads

Points table

Fixtures

Pool D

Squads

Points table

Fixtures

Finals

Semi-finals

Final

References

External links
 Series home at ESPN Cricinfo

2018
2018 in Kenyan cricket
2018 in Namibian sport
2018 in Nigerian sport
2018 in South African cricket
2018 in Ugandan sport
2018 in Zimbabwean cricket
International cricket competitions in 2018